Pray for the Wicked is the sixth studio album by American pop rock solo project Panic! at the Disco. The album was released on June 22, 2018 on Fueled by Ramen in the US and WEA internationally. It is the follow-up to the band's fifth studio album, Death of a Bachelor (2016). The album was produced by Jake Sinclair and promoted by the singles "Say Amen (Saturday Night)", "High Hopes" and "Hey Look Ma, I Made It", with "(Fuck A) Silver Lining", "Dancing's Not a Crime" and "King of the Clouds" as promotional singles. It received generally positive reviews upon release, with many critics noting Urie's Broadway influences following his performance in Kinky Boots.

Background
Panic! at the Disco released their fifth studio album, Death of a Bachelor, on January 16, 2016. To promote the record, the band embarked on a co-headling tour with Weezer that summer and a United States tour the following year. On April 11, 2017, it was reported that vocalist Brendon Urie would be making his Broadway debut as one of the lead roles in Kinky Boots. Urie performed in the show for ten weeks from May until August 2017.

Following the success of Death of a Bachelor, Urie was given the rest of 2017 off by the band's record label, Fueled by Ramen. However, Urie felt compelled to continue writing music during his time off. The writing process began a month before Urie made his debut in Kinky Boots when he wrote the chorus of "High Hopes". Urie stated that writing the record took about four months total in the span of a year and a half.

Urie teased the band's then-unannounced sixth studio album sporadically throughout late 2017 and early 2018, typically through Instagram Live broadcasts.  On March 8, 2018, the band began teasing the release of a lead single and a subsequent album with a two minute long video of Urie brushing his teeth beside an alarm clock reading "3:19" for the video's entirety, accompanied by an orchestral version of "King of the Clouds". The time on the clock led fans to believe that the band would be releasing new material on March 19. Over a week later, fans received packages sent from Urie's P.O. box containing a white bottle reading "Pray for the W!cked / 3:21 / Unholy Water", once more leading to speculation over a release date of March 21. On March 19, the band announced a surprise show at the Grog Shop in Cleveland, Ohio that night. The band unveiled their new touring bassist, Nicole Row, who would be replacing their former member and touring bassist, Dallon Weekes, following his departure on December 27, 2017. No new material was performed at the show.

The album was announced on March 21, 2018, alongside the release of the lead single "Say Amen (Saturday Night)" and a B-side, "(Fuck A) Silver Lining".

The second single "High Hopes" was released on May 23, 2018, followed by the pre-release track "King of the Clouds" on June 18, 2018.

The singles for the album were released in three Spotify combinations: Say Amen for Silver Linings, High Hopes on Saturday Night, and King of High Hopes.

Critical reception

Pray for the Wicked has received generally positive reviews from music critics. It holds an average score of 70 out of 100 on Metacritic based on nine reviews, indicating "generally favorable reviews." In a positive review, The Independent said, "Panic! have never released the same album twice, but on Pray for the Wicked it feels as if they've finally managed to channel that frenetic, slightly chaotic attitude into a studio album that is at once eclectic and coherent." In another positive review, NME commented on the influence of Brendon Urie being involved in Kinky Boots on the sound of the album, adding that "while it's fair to say he's always had a flair for theatrics, the experience has injected these tracks with unprecedented levels of sass and drama". Newsday suggested that Urie's "Broadway stint brings him a creative burst and a theatrical bent".

Commercial performance
Pray for the Wicked debuted at number one on the US Billboard 200 with 180,000 album-equivalent units, of which 151,000 were pure album sales. It is the band's second US number-one album. The album also debuted at number one on the ARIA Albums Chart, making it the band's second Australian number-one album. According to Billboard, Pray for the Wicked was the 10th best selling vinyl album of 2018 in the US with sales of 59,000, making a major contribution to the 15% rise of the format in that year. The album was also certified Platinum by the Recording Industry Association of America (RIAA) in the United States.

Track listing

Track notes
  signifies a co-producer
  signifies an additional producer

Samples 
 "(Fuck A) Silver Lining" contains elements from "Oh What a Night" by The Dells.
 "Say Amen (Saturday Night)" contains interpolations of "Aphasia" by The Budos Band and "Crying Pine Grove Blues" by Nathan Abshire.
 "Roaring 20s" and "Old Fashioned" contain elements of "Latino Lovewalk" by Maynard Ferguson.
 "Dancing's Not a Crime" contains samples from "Get Down" by Chris Bernard.
 "The Overpass" contains elements of "Chase" by James Brown and an interpolation of "Mama Feelgood" by Lyn Collins.

Personnel 
Credits adapted from the liner notes of Pray for the Wicked.

Panic! at the Disco
 Brendon Urie – lead vocals, guitar (track 3), bass (tracks 1–3), drums (tracks 2–7, 9 and 10), keyboards (tracks 2–4 and 11), background vocals (tracks 1–7, 9 and 10)

Additional musicians
 Jake Sinclair – background vocals (tracks 1–7, 9 and 10), bass (tracks 4–9), organ (tracks 5 and 6), guitar (track 4), acoustic guitar (track 10)
 Rob Mathes – conductor, string and horn arrangements
 Kenneth Harris – guitar (tracks 1–7, 9 and 10), background vocals (tracks 1–7 and 10)
 Suzy Shinn – background vocals (tracks 1–7, 9 and 10)
 Scott Chesak – drums (tracks 1 and 8), keyboards (track 1 and 8), guitar (track 8), bass (track 8), percussion (track 1)
 Morgan Kibby – background vocals (track 3)
 Ilsey Juber – background vocals (track 4)
 Sam Hollander – background vocals (tracks 5, 7, and 10)
 Alex Kresovich – piano (track 9), organ (track 9)
 Rachel White – background vocals (track 9)
 Kate Micucci – background vocals (track 9)
 Thomas Bowes – string leader, concertmaster (London), violin
 Bruce Dukov – concertmaster (Los Angeles), violin
 Charlie Bisharat – violin
 Julie Gigante – violin
 Jessica Guideri – violin
 Lisa Lui – violin
 Maya Magub – violin
 Serena McKinney – violin
 Helen Nightengale – violin
 Katia Popov – violin
 Tereza Stanislav – violin
 Warren Zielinski – violin
 Jackie Hartley – violin
 Rita Manning – violin
 Peter Hanson – violin
 Tom Pigott-Smith – violin
 Emlyn Singleton – violin
 Cathy Thompson – violin
 Brian Dembow – string leader (Los Angeles), viola
 Robert Brophy – viola
 Shawn Mann – viola
 Zach Dellinger – viola
 Peter Lale – string leader (London), viola
 Bruce White – viola
 Steve Erdody – string leader (Los Angeles), cello
 Jacob Braun – cello
 Eric Byers – cello
 Caroline Dale – string leader (London), cello
 Tim Gill – cello
 Jason Fabus – saxophone
 Peter Slocombe – saxophone
 Morgan Jones – saxophone
 Mike Rocha – trumpet
 Jonathan Bradley – trumpet
 Ryan Dragon – trombone
 Peter Cobbin – strings (track 9)

Additional personnel
 Rosanna Jones – album illustrations
 Jimmy Fontaine – photography

Production
 Jake Sinclair – production
 Suzy Shinn – additional production (tracks 2 and 6–9), engineering
 Scott Chesak – production (track 1 and 8)
 Dillon Francis – production (track 3)
 Chill Pill – co-production (track 7), engineering (track 7)
 Alex Kresovich – co-production (track 9)
 Claudius Mittendorfer – mixing
 Emily Lazar – mastering
 Chris Allgood – assistant mastering

Charts

Weekly charts

Year-end charts

Decade-end charts

Certifications

References

2018 albums
Fueled by Ramen albums
Panic! at the Disco albums
Albums produced by Suzy Shinn
DCD2 Records albums